Antoine Charles Horace Vernet, better known as Carle Vernet (14 August 175827 November 1836), was a French painter, the youngest child of Claude Joseph Vernet and the father of Horace Vernet.

Biography

Vernet was born in Bordeaux. At the age of five, he showed an extraordinary passion for drawing horses, but went through the regular academical course as a pupil of his father and of Nicolas-Bernard Lépicié. Strangely, after winning the Prix de Rome (1782), he seemed to lose interest in the occupation, and his father had to recall him from Rome to prevent his entering a monastery.

In his "Triumph of Aemilius Paulus", Vernet broke with tradition and drew the horse with the forms he had learnt from nature in stables and riding schools. His hunting pieces, races, landscapes, and work as a lithographer were also very popular.

Carle's sister was executed by the guillotine during the Revolution. After this, he gave up art.

When he again began to produce under the French Directory (1795–1799), his style had changed radically. He started drawing in minute detail battles and campaigns to glorify Napoleon. His drawings of Napoleon's  Italian campaign won acclaim as did the Battle of Marengo,  and for his Morning of Austerlitz Napoleon awarded him the Legion of Honour, and Louis XVIII of France awarded him the Order of Saint Michael. Afterwards he excelled in hunting scenes and depictions of horses.

In addition to being a painter and lithographer, Carle Vernet was an avid horseman. Just days before his death at the age of seventy-eight, he was seen racing as if he were a sprightly young man.

He died in Paris.

Literary references
In Arthur Conan Doyle's short story "The Adventure of the Greek Interpreter", fictional detective Sherlock Holmes claims that his grandmother is the French artist, Vernet's sister, without stating whether this is Claude Joseph Vernet, Carle Vernet, or Horace Vernet.

In Maria Wirtemberska's novel Malvina, or the Heart's Intuition (1816; English translation 2001, by Ursula Phillips), it is said that a view that is being described merits the talent of Vernet, who as the writer explains in her own footnote was a sea painter.

Selected works

See also
Les Neuf Sœurs
Felice Cerruti Bauduc

References

1758 births
1835 deaths
Artists from Bordeaux
18th-century French painters
French male painters
19th-century French painters
Prix de Rome for painting
Recipients of the Legion of Honour
Members of the Académie des beaux-arts
19th-century French male artists
18th-century French male artists